The 1984 Country Music Association Awards, 18th Ceremony, was held on October 8, 1984, at the Grand Ole Opry House, Nashville, Tennessee, and was hosted by CMA Award winner Kenny Rogers.

Winners and nominees

Hall of Fame

References 

Country Music Association
CMA
Country Music Association Awards
Country Music Association Awards
Country Music Association Awards
Country Music Association Awards
20th century in Nashville, Tennessee
Events in Nashville, Tennessee